Adnan Omran (born 1934) is a Syrian diplomat and politician who served as information minister from 2000 to 2003.

Early life and education
Omran was born in 1934. He holds a bachelor's degree in public law, which he received from Syrian University in Damascus in 1956. Then he obtained a diploma in Syrian private law. He also received a diploma in diplomatic studies and international law from Columbia University in New York City in 1964.

Career
After graduation, Omran began to serve as a member of the permanent mission of Syria to the United Nations in 1964. Two years later he was named as first secretary of the Syrian Embassy in Moscow. His tenure ended in 1968, and he served as counsel general of the Syrian Arab Republic in Berlin until 1970. Next he was appointed director of the international organisations department and special offices at the Syrian foreign ministry. He served there until 1974. Then he was named as Syrian ambassador to the United Kingdom and then, to Sweden from 1974 to 1980.

Omran began to assume political positions in 1980. His first political post was assistant secretary general for political affairs, which he held until 1996. He represented Syria and the League of Arab States at various international conferences and also, committees of the United Nations. He also held the post of the Arab League assistant secretary general during this period. In 1996, Omran was appointed deputy foreign minister and served in this post until 1998. He was a member of the Ba'ath Party's central committee in 2000.

He was appointed minister of information on 14 March 2000 to the cabinet headed by Prime Minister Mohammad Mustafa Mero under Hafez Assad. Omran replaced Mohammad Salman as information minister. Omran's appointment raised hopes that Syrian media would be given more liberty. However, on 29 January 2001, Omran argued that the term civil society was developed by the US and that its meaning was modified by the opposition groups in Syria in an attempt to form political parties. He continued to serve as information minister after the first cabinet reshuffle by Bashar al-Assad when he became the president. In September 2003, Mero resigned from office, and Mohammad Naji Al Otari formed a new cabinet. Omran was replaced by Ahmad Hassan as information minister on 10 September 2003.

Omran was named as a member of the Committee of Patrons of the Anglo-Arab Organisation in January 2003.

References

External links

20th-century diplomats
21st-century Syrian politicians
1934 births
Ambassadors of Syria to Sweden
Ambassadors of Syria to the United Kingdom
Arab Socialist Ba'ath Party – Syria Region politicians
Damascus University alumni
Columbia University alumni
Living people
Syrian ministers of information